The 2012 Coates Hire Ipswich 300 was a motor race for the Australian sedan-based V8 Supercars. It was the eighth event of the 2012 International V8 Supercars Championship. It was held on the weekend of 3–5 August at Queensland Raceway, in Ipswich, Queensland.

Craig Lowndes clean-swept the event, leading to five-straight victories at this circuit and this event. The results of the two races were remarkable similar with Lowndes, Mark Winterbottom and Jamie Whincup completing the podium in order in both races. Fabian Coulthard, Will Davison and Russell Ingall shared fourth to sixth in different orders. Shane van Gisbergen was seventh in both races while Michael Caruso and Tim Slade shared eight and ninth. With Lowndes winning and Winterbottom finishing ahead of Whincup the top four positions in the championship chase tightened will pulling further away from the rest of the field.

Canadian Formula One world champion Jacques Villeneuve again performed a fill-in role, substituting for Greg Murphy for the second time while Murphy recovered from back surgery.

Report

Race 16

Race

Race 17

Race

Standings
 After 17 of 30 races.

References

Coates Hire